In mathematics, a knee of a curve (or elbow of a curve) is a point where the curve visibly bends, specifically from high slope to low slope (flat or close to flat), or in the other direction. This is particularly used in optimization, where a knee point is the optimum point for some decision, for example when there is an increasing function and a trade-off between the benefit (vertical y axis) and the cost (horizontal x axis): the knee is where the benefit is no longer increasing rapidly, and is no longer worth the cost of further increases – a cutoff point of diminishing returns.

In heuristic use, the term may be used informally, and a knee point identified visually, but in more formal use an explicit objective function is used, and depends on the particular optimization problem. A knee may also be defined purely geometrically, in terms of the curvature or the second derivative.

Definitions 
The knee of a curve can be defined as a vertex of the graph. This corresponds with the graphical intuition (it is where the curvature has a maximum), but depends on the choice of scale.

The term "knee" as applied to curves dates at least to the 1910s,
and is found more commonly by the 1940s, being common enough to draw criticism. The unabridged Webster's Dictionary (1971 edition) gives definition 3h of knee as:

Criticism 
Graphical notions of a "knee" of a curve, based on curvature, are criticized due to their dependence on the coordinate scale: different choices of scale result in different points being the "knee".

Applications 
 Elbow method
 Maximum power point tracking

References 

 
 

Curvature (mathematics)
Mathematical optimization
Operations research